Lakkireddipalle is a village in Annamayya district of the Indian state of Andhra Pradesh. It is located in Lakkireddipalle mandal of Rayachoti revenue division.

Geography

References

Villages in Kadapa district